Craig Breedlove (born March 23, 1937) is an American professional race car driver and a five-time world land speed record holder.

Land vehicle speed records
In 1962, he made his first attempt, in a freewheeling tricycle (ignoring FIA rules requiring four wheels, at least two driven; in the event, FIM happily accepted it) powered by a General Electric J47 turbojet engine. On August 5, 1963, this first Spirit made its first record attempt, using just 90% of available thrust to reach  over the measured mile. Spirit of America was so light on the ground that it did not even need to change tires afterward.

For 1964, Breedlove faced competition from Walt Arfons' Wingfoot Express (piloted by Tom Green), as well as from brother Art Arfons in his four-wheel, FIA-legal Green Monster. This pass was not without incident, however, for one of his drogue parachute's shroud lines parted, and Spirit of America ran on for  before hitting a telegraph pole and coming to rest in a lake.

In response, Breedlove built an FIA-legal four-wheeler, Sonic I, powered by a  J79 turbojet. On November 15, Breedlove responded with a  record (after turning in an amazing  return pass), which held until 1970. (It would be broken by Gary Gabelich's Blue Flame, which reached .) To take the record back, Breedlove planned a supersonic rocket car, "complete with ejector seat." Also in 1965, Breedlove's wife, Lee Breedlove, took the seat in Sonic 1, making four passes and achieving , making her the fastest woman alive, and making them the fastest couple, which they remain. According to author Rachel Kushner, Craig had talked Lee into taking the car out for a record attempt in order to monopolize the salt flats for the day and block one of his competitors from making a record attempt.

During 1968, Lynn Garrison, President of Craig Breedlove & Associates, started to package a deal that saw Utah's Governor, Calvin Rampton, provide a hangar facility for the construction of a supersonic car. Bill Lear, of Learjet fame, was to provide support, along with his friend Art Linkletter. Playboy magazine hoped to have the car painted black, with a white bunny on the rudder. TRW was supplying a lunar lander rocket motor. A change in public interest saw the concept shelved for a period of time.

They also negotiated for the use of the late Donald Campbell's wheel-driven Bluebird CN7 record-breaker.

After a lengthy break from world records and making his name as a real estate agent, Breedlove began work on a new Spirit in 1992, eventually named Spirit of America Formula Shell LSRV. The vehicle is 44 ft. 10 in. long, 8 ft. 4 in. wide, and 5 ft. 10 in. high (13.67 m by 2.54 m by 1.78 m) and weighs 9,000 lb (4,100 kg), construction is on a steel tube or space frame with an aluminium skin body. The engine is the same as in the second Spirit, a J79, but it is modified to burn unleaded gasoline and generates a maximum thrust of 22,650 lbf (100.75 kN).

Breedlove believes the vehicle is capable of exceeding , but has yet to demonstrate this.

In late 2006, Breedlove sold the car to Steve Fossett, who was to make an attempt on the land speed record in 2007. Fossett died in a plane crash in 2007, and the car was put up for sale. Breedlove's vehicle, renamed the "Sonic Arrow", was rolled out on the Black Rock Desert for a photo opportunity on October 15, 2007. The car is now on permanent display in the Wings Over the Rockies Air & Space Museum.

Endurance and speed records for AMC

Craig Breedlove was put on the payroll at American Motors Corporation (AMC) in 1968 to prepare the automaker's pony and high-performance cars, the Javelin and the AMX, for speed and endurance records.

Two cars were prepared for the endurance speed runs on a five-mile banked track in Texas. The shattered records included a Class C AMX (the No. 2 Lee Breedlove car) with the standard  AMC V8 engine (bored to 304 cubic inches) with 4-speed manual transmission, achieving a 24-hour average of  that was set by Craig and his wife Lee.

After the cars were displayed at the Chicago Auto Show in February 1968, Breedlove took the AMX to Bonneville.

Later in the year, American Motors entered three similarly equipped Javelins with  AMC V8 engines featuring Edelbrock cross-ram intake manifolds and special cylinder heads, in the C/Production class at Bonneville. During November 1968, the "Speed Spectacular Javelin" run by Breedlove was fastest, reaching  establishing a speed record that stood for a number of years.

Awards and legacy 
In 1993 Breedlove was inducted into the Motorsports Hall of Fame of America and in 2000 into the International Motorsports Hall of Fame.

He was inducted into the Automotive Hall of Fame in 2009.

The Beach Boys' song Spirit of America was "inspired by Breedlove's land speed record, set in 1963."

Land vehicle speed records
August 5, 1963 – Breedlove reached  in Spirit of America at Bonneville Salt Flats, Utah, thus earning him the land speed record.
October 13, 1964 – Breedlove reached  in Spirit of America at Bonneville, reclaiming the record from Art Arfons.
November 2, 1965 – Breedlove reached  in Spirit of America Sonic I at Bonneville, reclaiming the record from Art Arfons.

References

American Motors people
American racing drivers
International Motorsports Hall of Fame inductees
Land speed record people
1937 births
Living people
Bonneville 300 MPH Club members
Place of birth missing (living people)